The 2011 Copa Topper was a professional tennis tournament played on clay courts. It was the eighth edition of the tournament which is part of the 2011 ATP Challenger Tour. It took place in Buenos Aires, Argentina between 7 and 13 November 2011.

ATP entrants

Seeds

 1 Rankings are as of October 31, 2011.

Other entrants
The following players received wildcards into the singles main draw:
  Facundo Argüello
  Nicolás Pastor
  Marco Trungelliti
  Agustín Velotti

The following players received entry as a special exempt into the singles main draw:
  Juan Pablo Brzezicki

The following players received entry from the qualifying draw:
  Marcel Felder
  Andrey Kuznetsov
  Leandro Migani
  Diego Schwartzman

Champions

Singles

 Carlos Berlocq def.  Gastão Elias, 6–1, 7–6(7–3)

Doubles

 Carlos Berlocq /  Eduardo Schwank def.  Marcel Felder /  Jaroslav Pospíšil, 6–7(1–7), 6–4, [10–7]

External links
Official Website
ITF Search
ATP official site

Copa Topper
Clay court tennis tournaments
Tennis tournaments in Argentina
Challenger de Buenos Aires